The Delestres River is a tributary of the northeastern shore of Parent Lake (Abitibi) (the Bell River hydrographic slope, the Nottaway River and the Rupert Bay). The Delestres River flows in Senneterre, in the administrative region of Abitibi-Témiscamingue, in Quebec, in Canada.

The Delestres River flows successively into the townships of Martin, Augier and Delestre. The lower portion of the river is included in the Parent Lake Marsh Biodiversity Reserve.

The surface of the Delestres River is generally frozen from mid-December to mid-April. Forestry is the main economic activity of the sector; recreational tourism activities, second.

Geography

Toponymy 
The term "Delestres" is associated with the river and township that covers the central and southern part of Parent Lake (Abitibi). The name Delestres of these two hydronyms is a dedication to Alonié Delestre (spelled without "s" according to the historian André Vachan), a companion of Dollard Des Ormeaux. Before the proclamation of the township in 1916, the river was designated "Shabogama", Algonquian expression meaning "water penetrates".

The toponym "Delestres River" was formalized on December 5, 1968, at the Commission de toponymie du Quebec.

See also

References

External links 

Rivers of Abitibi-Témiscamingue
Nottaway River drainage basin
Jamésie
La Vallée-de-l’Or